John Green (1834July 17, 1877) was a Scottish American immigrant, merchant, and politician.  He served one term in the Wisconsin State Assembly (1867), and was a Union Army officer in the American Civil War.

Biography
Green was born in Scotland and emigrated to the United States with his parents and his nine siblings.

In 1864, he organized a company of volunteers for the Union Army and was mustered into the 37th Wisconsin Infantry Regiment as the captain of Company C.  He was injured while in the trenches in the Siege of Petersburg on June 17, 1864, and never fully recovered.  He was promoted to major on October 19, 1864, and was promoted to colonel in July 1865, after the war was technically ended.

After the war, he served one term in the Wisconsin State Assembly, representing southern Iowa County, and later worked as a merchant in Middleton, Wisconsin.

He died July 17, 1877, after a long illness.

References

External links
 

|-

1834 births
1877 deaths
Members of the Wisconsin State Assembly
People of Wisconsin in the American Civil War
Union Army colonels
Scottish emigrants to the United States